is a Japanese singer and songwriter from Itami, Hyōgo. She began her professional musical career at age 21 as a concert backup singer. From almost the very beginning of her career, Masami has sung themes for anime television and movies. She is especially well known for her songs from Revolutionary Girl Utena, Tales of Eternia The Animation, Slayers, Sorcerer Hunters, Di Gi Charat, Magic User's Club, Jungle de Ikou!, Akihabara Dennou Gumi, Ray the Animation, He Is My Master and Yu-Gi-Oh! Duel Monsters. She has performed material for more than 50 singles and 20 albums to date (including her work with JAM Project and Chihiro Yonekura).
Okui hosts @Tunes, an anime music news program, on the Japanese anime television network Animax.

Biography
Okui began her music career as a concert backup singer for Yuki Saito in November 1989.  Her first solo single "Dare Yori mo Zutto" was released in 1993, and was used as a theme song for the anime OAV The Girl from Phantasia.  She sang with voice actress Megumi Hayashibara for the anime television series Slayers in 1995.  In 2003, she teamed up with fellow artist Chihiro Yonekura to form the group r.o.r/s, an acronym for "Reflections of Renaissance/Sounds".  She also became a member of the supergroup JAM Project, which released the single "Little Wing" that served as the opening theme song for the anime television series Scrapped Princess.  She left Starchild Records and produced her own record label called "evolution", which lasted from 2003. In 2011, she ended her evolution label, left Geneon Universal Entertainment, and signed with Lantis.

Okui is a regular performer in the Animelo Summer Live annual concerts from "The Bridge" in 2005 to "Rainbow" in 2011. In October 2008, she went to Mexico with JAM Project where they performed at the Expo TNT 16.  She also performed in 2012 for EXPO TNT GT 6.

Discography

Studio albums

Compilation albums

Other albums

Singles

Videos 
Star Child
 Ma-KING Concert '97
 Do-can Diary
 A-Day
 Live in Hibiya -no cut-
 B-Day
 Document '00
 Birth Live '01
 C-Day
 Live Devotion
King Records
 V-mode −10th Anniversary-
Evolution
 GIGS 2004 ReBirth
 GIGS 2005 Dragonfly
 GIGS 2006 GodSpeed
 GIGS 2006 Evolution

References

External links 
  
  record label 
 Masami Okui at J-Music Italia 

1968 births
Living people
People from Itami, Hyōgo
Anime musicians
Japanese women pop singers
Japanese women rock singers
Japanese women singer-songwriters
Osaka University of Arts alumni
Musicians from Hyōgo Prefecture
20th-century Japanese women singers
20th-century Japanese singers
21st-century Japanese women singers
21st-century Japanese singers
JAM Project members